Oldshore Beg is a remote crofting township,  in western Sutherland, Scottish Highlands and is in the Scottish council area of Highland.

The hamlets of Balchrick, Droman, Blairmore and Oldshoremore  are all located within  of Oldshore Beg and are reached along the coast road from the south which passes through Achriesgill, Badcall and Kinlochbervie to reach Oldshore Beg from Rhiconich.

Oldshore Beg overlooks the small island of Eilean an Ròin Mòr which is uninhabited.

References 

Populated places in Sutherland